Margarella crebrilirulata is a species of sea snail, a marine gastropod mollusk in the family Calliostomatidae.

Description
The height of the shell attains 5 mm.

Distribution
This species can be found in the Ross Sea, Antarctica.

References

External links
 
 To World Register of Marine Species

crebrilirulata
Gastropods described in 1907